During the 2006–07 English football season, Leicester City F.C. competed in the Football League Championship.

Season summary
Another poor season saw Leicester struggle near the foot of the Championship table. Manager Rob Kelly was sacked after a 3–0 defeat at Plymouth Argyle and replaced by former Norwich City boss Nigel Worthington, who steered the Foxes to safety. Worthington expressed an interest in becoming permanent manager, but instead the club appointed Milton Keynes Dons manager Martin Allen as manager.

Kit
Leicester retained the previous season's kit, manufactured by British company JJB Sports and sponsored by Narborough-based bank Alliance & Leicester.

Final league table

Results
Leicester City's score comes first

Legend

Football League Championship

FA Cup

League Cup

Squad

Left club during season

Transfers

In
  Gareth McAuley: from  Lincoln City, Free
  Andy Johnson: from  West Bromwich Albion, Free
  Josh Low: from  Northampton Town, Free

Out
  Chris O'Grady: to  Rotherham United, £65,000
  Mohammed Sylla: to  Kilmarnock, Free

References

Leicester City F.C. seasons
Leicester City